John Robert Standing (born 3 September 1943) is an English former professional footballer who played as a right back in the Football League for Brighton & Hove Albion. He also played non-league football for Bognor Regis Town, Stevenage Town, Crawley Town and Hastings United, and managed Newhaven and Haywards Heath Town.

References

1943 births
Living people
People from Walberton
English footballers
Association football defenders
Bognor Regis Town F.C. players
Brighton & Hove Albion F.C. players
Stevenage Town F.C. players
Crawley Town F.C. players
Hastings United F.C. (1948) players
English Football League players
Southern Football League players
English football managers
Haywards Heath Town F.C. managers